Lodger is a Finnish rock band, formed by Teemu Merilä in 2002. Although largely unknown outside of Finland, they have established a cult following on the Internet due to the popularity of their Flash music videos. The song "Floozy With An Uzi" is taken from the novel Vineland by Thomas Pynchon.

History
In the latter half of 2002 singer/songwriter Teemu Merilä created Lodger as a vehicle for his music, bringing together Jyri Riikonen on keyboards, Hannes Häyhä on bass, Antti Laari on drums, and London-based Richard Anderson on guitar.

After almost a year of apparent hiatus, from summer of 2007 to spring of 2008, Lodger released three new songs and redesigned their website. Their third album, "Honeymoon is Over" was released on 19 November 2008.

In June 2009 Lodger indicated via Twitter that their next album would be titled Sunday of a Male Shouvinist. However, in February 2012, the band announced a new website which stated their next album would be titled Low Blue Flame and would be available to download for free. After a while, they made two songs from the new album available for listening on their website. On 25 December 2013 the other eight songs of Low Blue Flame was made available for listening on their site. On 9 January 2014 the band put up a mastered version of Low Blue Flame for free download on their website. The band has also stated that the album would see a CD-release some time in the future.

Style
Lodger's lyrics are often cynical and nihilistic; their discography includes such titles as "I Love Death" which details the drudgery in life of the average person and "God Has Rejected the Western World", an anthem decrying the superficiality of western society. Their unabashed attitude is most apparent in their music videos, which prominently features smoking, drinking, sex, masturbation, rape and death.

In Low Blue Flame, the same cynical style was applied to biblical figures.  For instance, Song of Job is a written monologue by the titular character from the Book of Job.

Discography

Hi-Fi High Lights Down Low (2004)
 "Two Smiles is a Long Walk"
 "Fickle"
 "Bad Place to Earn a Living"
 "I Love Death"
 "Short Man on TV"
 "Radio"
 "Ordinary Men Make Ordinary Music"
 "Doorsteps"
 "Everyone Got to Go"
 "Divine Right"
 "Big Day"
 "When I Was Six"
 "Siamese Cats"

Hi-Fi High Lights Down Low (Remastered) (2005)
 "Two Smiles is a Long Walk"
 "24h Candy Machine"
 "Bad Place to Earn a Living"
 "I Love Death"
 "Radio"
 "Doorsteps"
 "Short Man on TV"
 "Ordinary Men Make Ordinary Music"
 "Fickle"
 "Big Day"
 "When I Was Six"
 "Siamese Cats"

How Vulgar (2007)
 "Truck Driver"
 "Friends"
 "Satan"
 "Floozy With an Uzi"
 "Steal & Lie"
 "Wrong Bus"
 "Under One God"
 "Escape Plan"
 "I Would Like to Fulfill Your Dreams"
 "Brunswick Centre"
 "Don't Go Home Tonight"
 "Whatever the Weather"

Honeymoon Is Over (2008)
 "Requiem"
 "Chemicals"
 "Nostalgia"
 "Hairdo"
 "Recovering Alcoholic Visits Musso & Frank"
 "So Long"
 "I Was Young I Needed the Money"
 "Prefontaine"
 "Problems With Fat"
 "Girlfriend"
 "Go"

Low Blue Flame (2013)
 "All in this World"
 "Song of Job"
 "Son Father Holy Ghost"
 "Smoking for Jesus"
 "Lord is my Feeder"
 "Devil's Mind"
 "Lets get Married"
 "Every God Damn Morning"
 "When Our Days"
 "Silent Friend"

Music videos
"Doorsteps"
"I Love Death"
"God Has Rejected the Western World"
"24h Candy Machine"
"Floozy with an Uzi" (live version from album How Vulgar)
"Satan"
"Go"

References

External links

Lodger at Music Export Finland

Finnish alternative rock groups
Musical groups established in 2002
2002 establishments in Finland